Balthazar (also spelled Balthasar, Balthassar, or Baltazar), from Akkadian 𒂗𒈗𒋀 Bel-shar-uzur, meaning "Bel protects the King" is the name commonly attributed to Balthazar (magus), one of the Three Wise Men, at least in the west. Though no names are given in the Gospel of Matthew, this was one of the names the Western church settled on in the 8th century, based on the original meaning, though other names were used by Eastern churches. It is an alternate form of the Babylonian king Belshazzar, mentioned in the Book of Daniel.

The Armenian variation of the name is Baghdasar.

People with the name 
 Balthazar Alvarez (1533–1580), Spanish Catholic mystic
 Balthasar Bekker (1634–1698), Dutch philosopher
 Baltasar Brum (1883–1933), Uruguayan president
 Baldassare Castiglione (1478–1529), Italian Renaissance author
 Baltasar Corrada del Río (1935–2018), Puerto Rican politician
 Balthasar Eggenberger (died 1493), Austrian entrepreneur and financier in the Holy Roman Empire
 Baltasar Garzón (born 1955), Spanish judge
 Balthasar Gérard (c. 1557–1584), assassin of William I of Orange
 Balthazar Getty (born 1975), American actor and great grandson of J. Paul Getty
 Balthasar Glättli (born 1972), Swiss politician
 Baltasar Gracián y Morales (1601–1658), Spanish Baroque prose writer
 Balthasar Hubmaier (c. 1480–1528), German Anabaptist leader
 Balthazar Klossowski de Rola (1908–2001), birth name of twentieth-century artist Balthus
 Baltasar Lopes da Silva (1907–1989), Cape Verdean writer
 Balthazar P. Melick (1770–1835), founder of Chemical Bank
 Baltazar Maria de Morais Júnior (born 1959), Brazilian footballer
 Balthasar Ferdinand Moll (1717–1785), Baroque sculptor
 Balthasar de Monconys (1611–1665), French magistrate
 Balthasar Moncornet (c. 1600–1668), French engraver
 Balthasar Neumann (1687–1753) German engineer and architect
 Balthasar Oomkens von Esens (died 1540), 16th century Frisian rebel (two of whose brothers were named Caspar and Melchior)
 Balthasar Regis (died 1757), Canon of Windsor
 Balthasar Russow (1536–1600), Estonian chronicler
 Balthazar Johannes Vorster (1915–1983), apartheid-era South African Prime Minister and President
 McLeod John Baltazar Bethel-Thompson (born 1988), American football quarterback
 Hans Urs von Balthasar (1905–1988), Swiss Roman Catholic theologian and priest

Fictional characters with the name

Film 
 Balthasar, a demon in the film Constantine played by Gavin Rossdale
 Comte Balthazar de Bleuchamp, a pseudonym of the villain Ernst Stavro Blofeld in the James Bond novel On Her Majesty's Secret Service and the film of the same name
 Balthasar, a supporting character in the film The Scorpion King played by actor Michael Clarke Duncan
 Balthazar Blake, a thousand-year-old sorcerer, protagonist of the 2010 film The Sorcerer's Apprentice played by Nicolas Cage
 Balthazar Bratt, a supervillain and former child star, main antagonist of the 2017 film Despicable Me 3 voiced by Trey Parker
Edgar Balthazar, a butler, main antagonist of the 1970 film The Aristocats voiced by Roddy Maude-Roxby
 Balthazar M. Edison, male human who became the Villain "Krall" in the 2016 film "Star Trek: Beyond"

Gaming 
 Balthazar, the god of war and fire in the online game Guild Wars
 Balthazar, a fictional monk from Baldur's Gate II: Throne of Bhaal
 Balthasar (Old Man Bal), Nikolai Balthasar, and Maria Balthasar, characters from the Square game, Xenogears
 The primary antagonist in the Xbox game Azurik: Rise of Perathia
 The name of a minotaur and a lair in Might and Magic VIII
 Belthasar, one of the three Gurus who assist the main party in the RPG, Chrono Trigger

Novels 
 Balthasar, a character in The Death Gate Cycle books
 Balthazar More, a character in the Evernight series introduced in the Evernight series
 Bastian Balthazar Bux, the main character in the book The Neverending Story
 Balthazar, The Hound of Count Kaliovzky in the book The Red Necklace
 Jacob Balthazar, the wood sculptor murdered in the story Tintin and the Broken Ear
 Balthasar, a Tiger tank gunner in The Last Citadel: A Novel of the Battle of Kursk by David L. Robbins
 Balthasar, a supporting character in Ben-Hur: A Tale of the Christ, and its various adaptations
 Balthazar Claes, the main character of Honore de Balzac's The Quest of the Absolute in the series La Comédie humaine
 Balthazar (comics), a character in the Marvel Comics universe
 Balthazar Abrabanel, a character in 1632

Plays 
 Balthasar, a minor character in Romeo and Juliet
 Balthazar, Portia's masculine alter-ego, as well as a minor character in Shakespeare's The Merchant of Venice
 Balthasar, a singer and a follower of Don Pedro in Shakespeare's comedy Much Ado About Nothing
 Balthazar, a merchant in the Shakespeare's The Comedy of Errors
 Prince Balthazar, son of the Portuguese Viceroy, in Thomas Kyd's The Spanish Tragedy (1592)
 Baalthazar Macaw, an opera singing macaw in Robert J. Sherman's Love Birds (2015)

Television 
 Birk Balthazar, the father of Sofia Balthazar in Sofia the First
 Balthazar, a demon in the episode "Bad Girls" of the TV series Buffy the Vampire Slayer
 Balthasar, the godfather of Gargamel in The Smurfs
 Belthazor, alternate name of the character Cole Turner in the TV series Charmed, portrayed by Julian McMahon
 Balthazar, an angel in the TV series Supernatural, portrayed by Sebastian Roché
 Balthasar, one of three cooperating supercomputers in the anime series Neon Genesis Evangelion
 Balthazar, the dog on the British sitcom Vicious
 Baltazar, the main villain in the CGI Doctor Who story The Infinite Quest
 Balthazar, a stuffed bear who was the leader on Jim Henson's The Secret Life of Toys
 Balthazar Cavendish, friend of Vinnie Dakota in Milo Murphy's Law

See also 
 Balthazar (disambiguation)

References

French masculine given names
Masculine given names
Spanish masculine given names